Olga Isabel Viscal Garriga (May 5, 1929 – June 1995) was a public orator and political activist. Born in Brooklyn, New York, she moved to Puerto Rico, where she was a student leader and spokesperson of the Puerto Rican Nationalist Party's branch in Rio Piedras. As an advocate for Puerto Rican independence, she was sentenced to eight years in a U.S. federal penitentiary, for refusing to recognize the sovereign authority of the United States over Puerto Rico.

Early years
Olga Isabel Viscal Garriga was born in Brooklyn, New York in 1929. Her parents, Francisco Viscal Bravo and Laura Garriga Gonzalez, had moved there from Puerto Rico in the early 1920s. Olga was one of seven children born to the couple. The children were the fourth-great-grandchildren of Field Marshal Don Juan Andres Daban y Busterino, who served as the Spanish-appointed Governor and General Captain of Puerto Rico from 1783 to 1789. Her parents returned with the family to Puerto Rico, settling in Rio Piedras. Viscal was raised and educated there, after having witnessed discrimination against Puerto Ricans in New York. As she grew up, she strongly disagreed with U.S. policies that limited human rights, freedom of speech, and self-determination in Puerto Rico.

Student activist
Viscal enrolled in the University of Puerto Rico, where she earned her Doctoral Degree in Political Sciences. During the late 1940s, and while finishing her Ph.D., she became a student leader and spokesperson of the Puerto Rican Nationalist Party's branch in Rio Piedras. The Party was headed by Dr. Pedro Albizu Campos, and favored the forceful expulsion of the U.S. from Puerto Rico.

On May 21, 1948, a bill was introduced before the Puerto Rican Senate which would restrain the rights of the independence and Nationalist movements in the archipelago. The Senate, controlled by the Partido Popular Democrático (PPD) and presided by Luis Muñoz Marín, approved the bill that day. This bill, which resembled the anti-communist Smith Act passed in the United States in 1940, became known as the Ley de la Mordaza (Gag Law) when the U.S.-appointed governor of Puerto Rico, Jesús T. Piñero, signed it into law on June 10, 1948.

Under this new law it would be a crime to print, publish, sell, or exhibit any material intended to paralyze or destroy the insular government; or to organize any society, group or assembly of people with a similar destructive intent. It made it illegal to sing a patriotic song, and reinforced the 1898 law that had made it illegal to display the Flag of Puerto Rico, with anyone found guilty of disobeying the law in any way being subject to a sentence of up to ten years imprisonment, a fine of up to US$10,000, or both.

Viscal, who befriended Dr. Pedro Albizu Campos, was a talented orator and political activist. Although she was not directly involved in any violent act in 1950, Viscal was arrested because she participated in a demonstration that turned deadly in Old San Juan, after the police and other authorities opened fire on the demonstrators, one of whom was killed. She was detained on November 2, along with Carmen María Pérez Roque and Ruth Mary Reynolds (The American/Puerto Rican Nationalist) and held in the La Princesa jail. During her trial in the federal court in Old San Juan, she was uncooperative with the U.S. government prosecution and refused to recognize the authority of the U.S. over Puerto Rico. She was sentenced to eight years in prison for contempt of court, and released after serving five.

Later years
After her release from prison, Viscal went to Cuba, where she was the Puerto Rican representative to the Cuban Parliament. As such, she met with Fidel Castro and Che Guevara. She was a devout Catholic, and thus became disillusioned with Castro's politics and selectively atheist policies. After publicly criticizing Castro, she escaped from Cuba with the help of her younger sister, Irma. Olga Viscal Garriga died in June 1995 in San Juan, Puerto Rico.  She was the mother of three children, Pedro, Olga and Maria Luz.

Legacy
Viscal Garriga  was the inspiration for the main character Antígona, in the play La Pasión Según Antígona Pérez (The Passion According to Antígona Pérez), written by Puerto Rican playwright Luis Rafael Sánchez.

There is a plaque, located at the monument to the Jayuya Uprising participants in Mayagüez, Puerto Rico, honoring the women of the Puerto Rican Nationalist Party. Viscal Garriga's name is on the fifteenth line of the third plate.

Further reading
"War Against All Puerto Ricans: Revolution and Terror in America’s Colony"; Author: Nelson Antonio Denis; Publisher: Nation Books (April 7, 2015); .

See also

List of Puerto Ricans
History of women in Puerto Rico

19th Century female leaders of the Puerto Rican Independence Movement
 
María de las Mercedes Barbudo
Lola Rodríguez de Tió
Mariana Bracetti

Female members of the Puerto Rican Nationalist Party

Blanca Canales
Rosa Collazo 
Julia de Burgos 
Lolita Lebrón
Ruth Mary Reynolds 
Isabel Rosado
Isabel Freire de Matos
Isolina Rondón

 Articles related to the Puerto Rican Independence Movement

Puerto Rican Nationalist Party Revolts of the 1950s
Puerto Rican Nationalist Party
Ponce massacre
Río Piedras massacre
Puerto Rican Independence Party
Grito de Lares
Intentona de Yauco

References

External links
Viscal Family

1929 births
1995 deaths
People from Brooklyn
Puerto Rican Nationalist Party politicians
Puerto Rican people of Basque descent
Members of the Puerto Rican Nationalist Party
Puerto Rican rebels
Puerto Rican women in politics
Imprisoned Puerto Rican independence activists
Puerto Rican independence activists
Female revolutionaries